Australian wood cockroach is a common name that may refer to:

 Panesthia cribrata
 Panesthia australis

Common names of organisms
Animal common name disambiguation pages